The Tomb of Hadi Sabzavari is built by the Qajar dynasty and is the site of the Hadi Sabzavari burial. This building is located in Sabzevar, Iran.

Gallery

Sources 

National works of Iran
Mausoleums in Iran
Tourist attractions in Razavi Khorasan Province